
Gmina Skórzec is a rural gmina (administrative district) in Siedlce County, Masovian Voivodeship, in east-central Poland. Its seat is the village of Skórzec, which lies approximately 13 kilometres (8 mi) south-west of Siedlce and 77 km (48 mi) south-east of Warsaw.

Villages
Gmina Skórzec contains the villages and settlements of Boroszków, Czerniejew, Dąbrówka-Ług, Dąbrówka-Niwka, Dąbrówka-Stany, Dąbrówka-Wyłazy, Dobrzanów, Drupia, Gołąbek, Grala-Dąbrowizna, Kłódzie, Nowaki, Ozorów, Skarżyn, Skórzec, Stara Dąbrówka, Teodorów, Trzciniec, Wólka Kobyla, Żebrak and Żelków.

Neighbouring gminas
Gmina Skórzec is bordered by the gminas of Domanice, Kotuń, Siedlce, Wiśniew and Wodynie.

References

Polish official population figures 2006

Skorzec
Siedlce County